Îles-de-la-Madeleine is a provincial electoral district in the Gaspésie–Îles-de-la-Madeleine region of Quebec, Canada that elects members to the National Assembly of Quebec.  It consists of the Magdalen Islands and notably includes the city of Les Îles-de-la-Madeleine.

It was created for the 1897 election from a part of Gaspé electoral district.

In the change from the 2001 to the 2011 electoral map, its territory was unchanged; its territory is defined by the Election Act and does not undergo territorial changes.

Members of the Legislative Assembly / National Assembly 

This riding has elected the following Members of the National Assembly:

Election results

* Result compared to Action démocratique

|}

|}

|-

|}

|-

|-
 
|Independent
|Réal Lapierre
|align="right"|88
|align="right"|1.06
|align="right"|–
|-

|}

|-

|-

|}

|}

|-

|}

|-
 
|Union des électeurs
|Présille Beaulieu
|align="right"|39    
|align="right"|0.93
|align="right"|–
|-
|}

|-

|ALN
|Hormisdas Langlais
|align="right"|395      
|align="right"|19.57
|align="right"|–
|-

|Independent Lib.
|Ovide Hubert
|align="right"|265      
|align="right"|13.13
|align="right"|–
|-
|}

|-

|Conservative
|Gérard Simard
|align="right"|761      
|align="right"|49.74
|}

|-

|Conservative
|Azade Arsenault
|align="right"|542
|align="right"|42.51
|align="right"|+7.44
|-
|}

|-

|Conservative
|François-Henri Delaney
|align="right"|363
|align="right"|35.07
|align="right"|–
|-
 
|Independent
|William Chambers Leslie
|align="right"|261
|align="right"|25.22
|align="right"|-4.22
|-
|}

|-
 
|Independent
|William Chambers Leslie
|align="right"|317
|align="right"|29.44
|align="right"|–
|-
|}

References

External links
Information
 Elections Quebec

Election results
 Election results (National Assembly)
 Election results (QuébecPolitique)

Maps
 2011 map (PDF)
 2001 map (Flash)
2001–2011 changes (Flash)
1992–2001 changes (Flash)
 Electoral map of Gaspésie–Îles-de-la-Madeleine region
 Quebec electoral map, 2011

Iles-de-la-Madeleine